The LeRoy Apker Award is a prize that has been awarded annually by the American Physical Society (APS) since 1978, named after the experimental physicist LeRoy Apker. The recipients are undergraduate students chosen for "outstanding achievements in physics" in order to "provide encouragement to young physicists who have demonstrated great potential for future scientific accomplishment." The Apker award is the highest honor awarded to undergraduate physicists in the United States.  Generally, two prizes are awarded each year: one to a student from a Ph.D. granting institution and one to a student from a non-Ph.D. granting institution. Prior to 1995 the award was granted without institutional distinction, and a single honoree annually was common. The award consists of a $5,000 prize, allowance for traveling to the APS March Meeting to present the work, and a certificate.

Recipients

See also
 List of physics awards
 List of prizes named after people
 Morgan Prize, an award for outstanding undergraduate mathematicians

References

Awards of the American Physical Society
Apker, Leroy, Award
1978 establishments in the United States
Early career awards